"A Collegiate Casting-Out of Devilish Devices" is a Discworld short story by Terry Pratchett. The story describes the reaction of the wizards of the Unseen University to a proposal from the Patrician to introduce regulation of university education. It references the government inspector A. E. Pessimal, who goes on to have a significant role in Thud!

It was first published in the 13 May 2005 issue of The Times Higher Education Supplement, and can be found in certain editions of Snuff. It was included in the 2012 short fiction anthology A Blink of the Screen.

References

External links
 
A Collegiate Casting-Out of Devilish Devices
The story at the THES online

Discworld short stories
Works originally published in Times Higher Education
2005 short stories
Fantasy short stories